The Missionaries, also titled Sex, Love & Therapy, is a 2014 French romantic comedy film written, produced and directed by Tonie Marshall. The film stars Sophie Marceau and Patrick Bruel.

Cast 
 Sophie Marceau as Judith Chabrier 
 Patrick Bruel as Lambert Levallois 
 André Wilms as Michel Chabrier 
 Sylvie Vartan as Nadine Levallois 
 François Morel as Alain 
 Philippe Lellouche as Bruno  
 Jean-Pierre Marielle as himself  
 Patrick Braoudé as L'écureuil 
 Claude Perron as Fabienne Lavial 
 Pascal Demolon as Christian Lavial 
 Marie Rivière as Martine 
 Philippe Harel as Jacques 
 Scali Delpeyrat as Pierre Joubert 
 Camille Panonacle as Valérie Joubert
 Fanny Sidney as Véronique 
 Thomas Sagols as Luc 
 Laurent Heynemann as Le barbu  
 Fabienne Galula as Annie  
 Alexia Barlier as Daphné

References

External links 
 
 

2014 films
2014 romantic comedy films
2010s French-language films
French romantic comedy films
Warner Bros. films
Films directed by Tonie Marshall
2010s French films